Sin La (el. 5495 m.) is a high Himalayan mountain pass located in the eastern Kumaon in Pithoragarh District of Uttarakhand state in India.

This pass connects Bidang in Darma Valley to Jolingkong Lake in the Kuthi Yankti valley. Sin La is steep on both the sides and rocky. Adi Kailash peak is visible from here on clear sunny day. This pass was the part of ancient trade route of Bhotiyas to Tibet. The route is under heavy blanket of snow all year round.

Trek
Pithoragarh-Tawaghat-Pangu-Gala-Bundi-Gunji-Kutti-Jolinkong-Parvati-Bidang( Sin la pass trek-15 km).

See also
 Om Parvat

References

Mountain passes of Uttarakhand
Geography of Pithoragarh district
Mountain passes of the Himalayas